A closed system is a natural physical system that does not allow transfer of matter in or out of the system, although — in contexts such as physics, chemistry or engineering — the transfer of energy (e.g. as work or heat) is allowed.

In physics

In classical mechanics
In nonrelativistic classical mechanics, a closed system is a physical system that doesn't exchange any matter with its surroundings, and isn't subject to any net force whose source is external to the system. A closed system in classical mechanics would be equivalent to an isolated system in thermodynamics. Closed systems are often used to limit the factors that can affect the results of a specific problem or experiment.

In thermodynamics

In thermodynamics, a closed system can exchange energy (as heat or work) but not matter, with its surroundings.
An isolated system cannot exchange any heat, work, or matter with the surroundings, while an open system can exchange energy and matter. (This scheme of definition of terms is not uniformly used, though it is convenient for some purposes. In particular, some writers use 'closed system' where 'isolated system' is used here.)

For a simple system, with only one type of particle (atom or molecule), a closed system amounts to a constant number of particles. However, for systems which are undergoing a chemical reaction, there may be all sorts of molecules being generated and destroyed by the reaction process. In this case, the fact that the system is closed is expressed by stating that the total number of each elemental atom is conserved, no matter what kind of molecule it may be a part of. Mathematically:

There will be one such equation for each different element in the system.

In thermodynamics, a closed system is important for solving complicated thermodynamic problems. It allows the elimination of some external factors that could alter the results of the experiment or problem thus simplifying it. A closed system can also be used in situations where thermodynamic equilibrium is required to simplify the situation.

In quantum physics
This equation, called Schrödinger's equation, describes the behavior of an isolated or closed quantum system, that is, by definition, a system which does not interchange information (i.e. energy and/or matter) with another system. So if an isolated system is in some pure state |ψ(t) ∈ H at time t, where H denotes the Hilbert space of the system, the time evolution of this state (between two consecutive measurements).

In chemistry
In chemistry, a closed system is where no reactants or products can escape, only heat can be exchanged freely (e.g. an ice cooler). A closed system can be used when conducting chemical experiments where temperature is not a factor (i.e. reaching thermal equilibrium).

In engineering
In an engineering context, a closed system is a bound system, i.e. defined, in which every input is known and every resultant is known (or can be known) within a specific time.

See also
 Glossary of systems theory
 Dynamical system
 Isolated system
 Open system (systems theory)
 Sense and Respond
 Thermodynamic system

References

Cybernetics
Systems theory
Thermodynamic systems